The Natufian culture is a Late Epipaleolithic archaeological culture of the Levant, dating to around 15,000 to 11,500 years ago. The culture was unusual in that it supported a sedentary or semi-sedentary population even before the introduction of agriculture. The Natufian communities may be the ancestors of the builders of the first Neolithic settlements of the region, which may have been the earliest in the world. Some evidence suggests deliberate cultivation of cereals, specifically rye, by the Natufian culture at Tell Abu Hureyra, the site of earliest evidence of agriculture in the world. The world's oldest known evidence of the production of bread-like foodstuff has been found at Shubayqa 1, a 14,400-year-old site in Jordan's northeastern desert, 4,000 years before the emergence of agriculture in Southwest Asia In addition, the oldest known evidence of possible beer-brewing, dating to approximately 13,000 BP, was found at the Raqefet Cave in Mount Carmel near Haifa in Israel, although it may simply be a result of an organic and unintentional fermentation.

Generally, though, Natufians exploited wild cereals and hunted animals, including gazelles. Archaeogenetic analysis has revealed derivation of later (Neolithic to Bronze Age) Levantines primarily from Natufians, besides substantial admixture from Chalcholithic Anatolians.

Dorothy Garrod coined the term Natufian based on her excavations at the Shuqba cave (Wadi an-Natuf) near the town of Shuqba in the western occupied Palestinian Territories.

Discovery 

The Natufian culture was discovered by British archaeologist Dorothy Garrod during her excavations of Shuqba cave in the Judaean Hills, on the West Bank of the Jordan River. Prior to the 1930s, the majority of archaeological work taking place in British Palestine was biblical archaeology focused on historic periods, and little was known about the region's prehistory. 

In 1928, Garrod was invited by the British School of Archaeology in Jerusalem (BSAJ) to excavate Shuqba cave, where prehistoric stone tools had been discovered by Père Mallon four years earlier. She discovered a layer sandwiched between the Upper Palaeolithic and Bronze Age deposits characterised by the presence of microliths. She identified this with the Mesolithic, a transitional period between the Palaeolithic and the Neolithic which was well-represented in Europe but had not yet been found in the Near East. A year later, when she discovered similar material at el-Wad Terrace, Garrod suggested the name "the Natufian culture", after Wadi an-Natuf that ran close to Shuqba. 

Over the next two decades Garrod found Natufian material at several of her pioneering excavations in the Mount Carmel region, including el-Wad, Kebara and Tabun, as did the French archaeologist René Neuville, firmly establishing the Natufian culture in the regional prehistoric chronology. As early as 1931, both Garrod and Neuville drew attention to the presence of stone sickles in Natufian assemblages and the possibility that this represented a very early agriculture.

Dating

Radiocarbon dating places the Natufian culture at an epoch from the terminal Pleistocene to the very beginning of the Holocene, a time period between 12,500 and 9,500 BC.

The period is commonly split into two subperiods: Early Natufian (12,000–10,800 BC) and Late Natufian (10,800–9,500 BC). The Late Natufian most likely occurred in tandem with the Younger Dryas (10,800 to 9,500 BC). The Levant hosts more than a hundred kinds of cereals, fruits, nuts, and other edible parts of plants, and the flora of the Levant during the Natufian period was not the dry, barren, and thorny landscape of today, but rather woodland.

Precursors and associated cultures
The Natufian developed in the same region as the earlier Kebaran industry. It is generally seen as a successor, which evolved out of elements within that preceding culture. There were also other industries in the region, such as the Mushabian culture of the Negev and Sinai, which are sometimes distinguished from the Kebaran or believed to have been involved in the evolution of the Natufian.

More generally there has been discussion of the similarities of these cultures with those found in coastal North Africa. Graeme Barker notes there are: "similarities in the respective archaeological records of the Natufian culture of the Levant and of contemporary foragers in coastal North Africa across the late Pleistocene and early Holocene boundary". According to Isabelle De Groote and Louise Humphrey Natufians practiced the Iberomaurusian and Capsian custom of sometimes extracting their maxillary central incisors (upper front teeth).

Ofer Bar-Yosef has argued that there are signs of influences coming from North Africa to the Levant, citing the microburin technique and "microlithic forms such as arched backed bladelets and La Mouillah points." But recent research has shown that the presence of arched backed bladelets, La Mouillah points, and the use of the microburin technique was already apparent in the Nebekian industry of the Eastern Levant. And Maher et al. state that, "Many technological nuances that have often been always highlighted as significant during the Natufian were already present during the Early and Middle EP [Epipalaeolithic] and do not, in most cases, represent a radical departure in knowledge, tradition, or behavior."

Authors such as Christopher Ehret have built upon the little evidence available to develop scenarios of intensive usage of plants having built up first in North Africa, as a precursor to the development of true farming in the Fertile Crescent, but such suggestions are considered highly speculative until more North African archaeological evidence can be gathered. In fact, Weiss et al. have shown that the earliest known intensive usage of plants was in the Levant 23,000 years ago at the Ohalo II site.

Anthropologist C. Loring Brace (1993) cross-analysed the craniometric traits of Natufian specimens with those of various ancient and modern groups from the Near East, Africa and Europe. The Late Pleistocene Epipalaeolithic Natufian sample was described as problematic due to its small size (consisting of only three males and one female), as well as the lack of a comparative sample from the Natufians' putative descendants in the Neolithic Near East. Brace observed that the Natufian fossils lay between those of the Niger-Congo-speaking populations and the other samples (Near East, Europe), which he suggested may point to a Sub-Saharan influence in their constitution. Subsequent ancient DNA analysis of Natufian skeletal remains by Lazaridis et al. (2016) found that the specimens instead were a mix of 50% Basal Eurasian ancestral component (see Archaeogenetics) and 50% West-Eurasian Unknown Hunter Gatherer (UHG) population related to European Western Hunter-Gatherers.

According to Bar-Yosef and Belfer-Cohen, "It seems that certain preadaptive traits, developed already by the Kebaran and Geometric Kebaran populations within the Mediterranean park forest, played an important role in the emergence of the new socioeconomic system known as the Natufian culture."

Settlements
 
Settlements occur mostly in Israel and Palestine. This could be deemed the core zone of the Natufian culture, but Israel is a place that has been excavated more frequently than other places hence the greater number of sites. During the years more sites have been found outside the core zone of Israel and Palestine stretching into what now is Lebanon, Jordan, the Sinai Peninsula and the Negev desert. The settlements in the Natufian culture was larger and more permanent. Some Natufian sites had stone built architecture; Ain Mallaha is an example of round stone structures. Cave sites are also seen frequently during the Natufian culture. El-wad is a Natufian cave site with occupation in the front part of the cave also called the terrace. Some Natufian sites were located in forest/steppe areas and others near inland mountains. The Natufian settlements appear to be the first to exhibit evidence of food storage; not all Natufian sites have storage facilities, but they have been identified at certain sites.

Material culture

Lithics
The Natufian had a microlithic industry centered on short blades and bladelets. The microburin technique was used. Geometric microliths include lunates, trapezes, and triangles. There are backed blades as well. A special type of retouch (Helwan retouch) is characteristic for the early Natufian. In the late Natufian, the Harif-point, a typical arrowhead made from a regular blade, became common in the Negev. Some scholars use it to define a separate culture, the Harifian.

Sickle blades also appear for the first time in the Natufian lithic industry. The characteristic sickle-gloss shows that they were used to cut the silica-rich stems of cereals, indirectly suggesting the existence of incipient agriculture. Shaft straighteners made of ground stone indicate the practice of archery. There are heavy ground-stone bowl mortars as well.

Art 
The Ain Sakhri lovers, a carved stone object held at the British Museum, is the oldest known depiction of a couple having sex. It was found in the Ain Sakhri cave in the Judean desert.

Burials

Natufian grave goods are typically made of shell, teeth (of red deer), bones, and stone. There are pendants, bracelets, necklaces, earrings, and belt-ornaments as well.

In 2008, the 12,400–12,000 cal BC grave of an apparently significant Natufian female was discovered in a ceremonial pit in the Hilazon Tachtit cave in northern Israel.  Media reports referred to this person as a shaman. The burial contained the remains of at least three aurochs and 86 tortoises, all of which are thought to have been brought to the site during a funeral feast.  The body was surrounded by tortoise shells, the pelvis of a leopard, forearm of a wild boar, wingtip of a golden eagle, and skull of a stone marten.

Long-distance exchange 
At Ain Mallaha (in Northern Israel), Anatolian obsidian and shellfish from the Nile valley have been found. The source of malachite beads is still unknown. Epipaleolithic Natufians carried parthenocarpic figs from Africa to the southeastern corner of the Fertile Crescent, c. 10,000 BC.

Other finds
There was a rich bone industry, including harpoons and fish hooks. Stone and bone were worked into pendants and other ornaments. There are a few human figurines made of limestone (El-Wad, Ain Mallaha, Ain Sakhri), but the favorite subject of representative art seems to have been animals. Ostrich-shell containers have been found in the Negev.

In 2018, the world's oldest brewery was found, with the residue of 13,000-year-old beer, in a prehistoric cave near Haifa in Israel when researchers were looking for clues into what plant foods the Natufian people were eating. This is 8,000 years earlier than experts previously thought beer was invented.

A study published in 2019 shows an advanced knowledge of lime plaster production at a Natufian cemetery in Nahal Ein Gev II site in the Upper Jordan Valley dated to 12 thousand (calibrated) years before present [k cal BP]. Production of plaster of this quality was previously thought to have been achieved some 2,000 years later.

Subsistence

The Natufian people lived by hunting and gathering. The preservation of plant remains is poor because of the soil conditions, but at some sites such as Abu Hureira there has been excavated substantial large amounts of plant remains discovered through flotation. However wild cereals like legumes, almonds, acorns and pistachios have been collected through out most of the Levant. Animal bones show that gazelle (Gazella gazella and Gazella subgutturosa) were the main prey.  Additionally, deer, aurochs and wild boar were hunted in the steppe zone, as well as onagers and caprids (ibex). Waterfowl and freshwater fish formed part of the diet in the Jordan River valley.  Animal bones from Salibiya I (12,300 – 10,800 cal BP) have been interpreted as evidence for communal hunts with nets, however, the radiocarbon dates are far too old compared to the cultural remains of this settlement, indicating contamination of the samples.

Development of agriculture
A pita-like bread has been found from 12,500 BC attributed to Natufians. This bread is made of wild cereal seeds and papyrus cousin tubers, ground into flour.

According to one theory, it was a sudden change in climate, the Younger Dryas event (c. 10,800 to 9500 BC), which inspired the development of agriculture. The Younger Dryas was a 1,000-year-long interruption in the higher temperatures prevailing since the Last Glacial Maximum, which produced a sudden drought in the Levant.  This would have endangered the wild cereals, which could no longer compete with dryland scrub, but upon which the population had become dependent to sustain a relatively large sedentary population.  By artificially clearing scrub and planting seeds obtained from elsewhere, they began to practice agriculture. However, this theory of the origin of agriculture is controversial in the scientific community.

Domesticated dog

At the Natufian site of Ain Mallaha in Israel-Palestine, dated to 12,000 BC, the remains of an elderly human and a four-to-five-month-old puppy were found buried together. At another Natufian site at the cave of Hayonim, humans were found buried with two canids.

Archaeogenetics

Ancient DNA analysis has confirmed the genetic relationship between Natufians and other ancient and modern Middle Easterners and the broader West-Eurasian meta-population (i.e. Europeans and South-Central Asians). The Natufian population displays also ancestral ties to Paleolithic Taforalt samples, the makers of the Epipaleolithic Iberomaurusian culture of the Maghreb, the Pre-Pottery Neolithic culture of the Levant, the Early Neolithic Ifri n'Amr or Moussa culture of the Maghreb, the Late Neolithic Kelif el Boroud culture of the Maghreb, with samples associated with these early cultures all sharing a common genomic component dubbed the "Natufian component", which diverged from other West-Eurasian lineages ~26,000 years ago, and is most closely linked to the Arabian lineage.

Individuals associated with the Natufian culture have been found to cluster with other West-Eurasian populations, but also have substantial higher ancestry that can be traced back to the hypothetical "Basal Eurasian" lineage, which contributed in varying degrees to all West-Eurasian lineages, except the Ancient North Eurasians, and peaks among modern Gulf Arabs. The Natufians were already differentiated from other West-Eurasian lineages, such as the Anatolian farmers north of the Levant, that contributed to the peopling of Europe in significant amounts, and who had some Western Hunter Gatherer-like (WHG) inferred ancestry, in contrast to Natufians who lacked this component (similar to Neolithic Iranian farmers from the Zagros mountains). This might suggest that different strains of West-Eurasians contributed to Natufians and Zagros farmers, as both Natufians and Zagros farmers descended from different populations of local hunter gatherers. Contact between Natufians, other Neolithic Levantines, Caucasus Hunter Gatherers (CHG), Anatolian and Iranian farmers is believed to have decreased genetic variability among later populations in the Middle East. Migrations from the Near-East also occurred towards Africa, and the West-Eurasian geneflow into the Horn of Africa is best represented by the Levant Neolithic, and may be associated with the spread of Afroasiatic languages. The scientists suggest that the Levantine early farmers may have spread southward into East Africa, bringing along the associated ancestral components.

According to ancient DNA analyses conducted in 2016 by Iosif Lazaridis et al. and discussed in two articles "The Genetic Structure of the World's First Farmers" (June 2016) and "Genomic Insights into the Origin of Farming in the Ancient Near East (July 2016)  on Natufian skeletal remains from present-day northern Israel, the remains of 5 Natufians carried the following paternal haplgroups:

 E1b1b1b2 (xE1b1b1b2a, E1b1b1b2b) - meaning an unspecified branch of E1b1b1b2
 E1b1 (xE1b1a1, E1b1b1b1) - i.e. a branch of E1b1 that is neither E1b1a1 nor E1b1b1b1.
 E1b1b1 - originally classified as CT but further defined as E1b1b1 by Martiniano et al. 2020.

A 2018 analysis by Daniel Shriner, using modern populations as a reference, suggested that the Natufians carried a small amount of Eastern African ancestry (~6.8%) associated with the modern Omotic-speaking groups of southern Ethiopia. The study also suggested that this component may be the source of Y-haplogroup E (particularly Y-haplogroup E-M215, also known as "E1b1b") among Natufians.

Language
Alexander Militarev,  Vitaly Shevoroshkin and others have linked the Natufian culture to the proto-Afroasiatic language, which they in turn believe has a Levantine origin. Some scholars, for example Christopher Ehret, Roger Blench and others, contend that the Afroasiatic Urheimat is to be found in North Africa or Northeast Africa, probably in the area of Egypt, the Sahara,  Horn of Africa or Sudan. Within this group, Ehret, who like Militarev believes Afroasiatic may already have been in existence in the Natufian period, would associate Natufians only with the Near Eastern Proto-Semitic branch of Afroasiatic.

Sites
The Natufian culture has been documented at dozens of sites. Around 90 have been excavated, including:

 Aammiq 2
 Tell Abu Hureyra
 Abu Salem
 Abu Usba
 Ain Choaab
 Ain Mallaha (Eynan)
 Ain Rahub
 Ain Sakhri
 Ala Safat
 Antelias Cave
 Azraq 18 (Ain Saratan)
 Baaz
 Bawwab al Ghazal
 Beidha
 Dederiyeh
 Dibsi Faraj
 El Khiam
 El Kowm I
 El Wad
 Erq el Ahmar
 Fazael IV & VI
 Gilgal II
 Givat Hayil I
 Har Harif K7
 Hatoula
 Hayonim Cave and Hayonim Terrace
 Hilazon Tachtit
 Hof Shahaf
 Huzuq Musa
 Iraq ed Dubb
 Iraq el Barud
 Iraq ez Zigan
 J202
 J203
 J406a
 J614
 Jayroud 1–3 & 9
 Jebel Saaidé II
 Jeftelik
 Jericho
 Kaus Kozah
 Kebara
 Kefar Vitkin 3
 Khallat Anaza (BDS 1407)
 Khirbat Janba
 Kosak Shamali
 Maaleh Ramon East
 Maaleh Ramon West
 Moghr el Ahwal
 Mureybet
 Mushabi IV & XIX
 Nachcharini Cave
 Nahal Ein Gev II
 Nahal Hadera I and Nahal Hadera IV (Hefsibah)
 Nahal Oren
 Nahal Sekher 23
 Nahal Sekher VI
 Nahr el Homr 2
 Qarassa 3
 Ramat Harif (G8)
 Raqefet Cave
 Rosh Horesha
 Rosh Zin
 Sabra 1
 Saflulim
 Salibiya 1
 Salibiya 9
 Sands of Beirut
 Shluhat Harif
 Shubayqa 1
 Shubayqa 6
 Shukhbah Cave
 Shunera VI
 Shunera VII
 Tabaqa (WHS 895)
 Taibé
 TBAS 102
 TBAS 212
 Tor at Tariq (WHS 1065)
 Tugra I
 Upper Besor 6
 Wadi Hammeh 27
 Wadi Jilat 22
 Wadi Judayid (J2)
 Wadi Mataha
 Yabrud 3
 Yutil al Hasa (WHS 784)

See also

 Prehistory of the Levant
 Proto-Afroasiatic language
 Afroasiatic Urheimat

References

Further reading

External links 

 Epi-Palaeolithic (European Mesolithic) Natufian Culture of Israel (The History of the Ancient Near East)
 
The genetic structure of the world’s first farmers, Lazaridis et al, 2016

 
Industries (archaeology)
Archaeological cultures of West Asia
Archaeological cultures of the Near East
Hunter-gatherers of Asia
Epipalaeolithic cultures
Archaeological cultures in Israel
Archaeological cultures in Jordan
Archaeological cultures in Lebanon
Archaeological cultures in Palestine
Archaeological cultures in Syria
Epipalaeolithic